Agrelo or Agrelos is a surname. It may refer to:

Agrelo, Lujan de Cuyo, Mendoza province, Argentina, an area famous for its wine
Agrelo Point or Cariz Point, the rocky north extremity of Nelson Island in the South Shetland Islands, Antarctica
Marilyn Agrelo, American film director and producer
Gonçalo Agrelos, (born 1998), sometimes known as Salo, Portuguese footballer